was a Japanese daimyo, swordsman, and martial arts writer, founder of the Edo branch of Yagyū Shinkage-ryū, which he learned from his father Yagyū "Sekishūsai" Muneyoshi. This was one of two official sword styles patronized by the Tokugawa shogunate (the other one being Ittō-ryū). Munenori began his career in the Tokugawa administration as a hatamoto, a direct retainer of the Tokugawa house, and later had his income raised to 10,000 koku, making him a minor fudai daimyō (vassal lord serving the Tokugawa), with landholdings around his ancestral village of Yagyū-zato.

Career
Munenori entered the service of Tokugawa Ieyasu at a young age, and later was an instructor of swordsmanship to Ieyasu's son Hidetada. Still later, he became one of the primary advisors of the third shōgun Iemitsu.

Shortly before his death in 1606, Sekishusai passed the leadership of Yagyū Shinkage-ryū to his grandson Toshiyoshi. Following a period of musha shugyō, Toshiyoshi entered the service of a cadet branch of the Tokugawa clan that controlled the Owari province. Takenaga Hayato, the founder of the Yagyū Shingan-ryū, was a disciple of Yagyū Munenori and received gokui (secret teachings) of the Yagyū Shinkage-ryū from him.

In about 1632, Munenori completed the Heihō kadensho, a treatise on practical Shinkage-ryū swordsmanship and how it could be applied on a macro level to life and politics. The text remains in print in Japan today, and has been translated a number of times into English.

Munenori's sons, Yagyū Jūbei Mitsuyoshi and Yagyū Munefuyu, were also famous swordsmen.

The essay "The Mysterious Record of Immovable Wisdom" by Takuan Sōhō was a letter written from Sōhō to Munenori.

Depictions in film
 (The Red Shadow), 1962 – played by Denjirō Ōkōchi  
 (Adventures of Nemuri Kyōshirō), 1964 (released on DVD as "Sleepy Eyes of Death: Sword of Adventure")
 (The Yagyu Conspiracy), 1978 – played by Yorozuya Kinnosuke (released on DVD as "The Shogun's Samurai")
' (Samurai Reincarnation), 1981 – played by Tomisaburo Wakayama
, 2003 – played by Nakamura Katsuo

Bibliography
A Hereditary Book on the Art of War

References

Further reading

External links
Summary of the book

 

1571 births
1646 deaths
Daimyo
Hatamoto
Japanese swordfighters
Martial arts writers
People of Azuchi–Momoyama-period Japan
People of Edo-period Japan
People of Muromachi-period Japan
Yagyū clan